Sexto Sentido is the fourteenth studio album and the tenth in Portuguese by Brazilian pop singer Xuxa. Was released on August 20, 1994 by the record company Som Livre.

Aimed at the children's audience, it was the first record of the presenter to win a title of their own, without depending on the programs presented by Xuxa as happened with the previous albums. Sexto Sentindo sold more than 1 million copies, gaining diamond certification by Associação Brasileira de Produtores de Discos (ABPD).

Production and songs
After a period full of international projects that were interrupted by a column problem, Xuxa began the year of 1994 decided that it would return to invest in the Brazilian public. The new program in Rede Globo gradually shaped itself and soon after, a new album began to be developed as well.

Xuxa's audience had been growing. Many of the children who accompanied her in the days of the Xou da Xuxa were already entering their adolescence and thus the need arose to produce a disc that could please all the age groups. In this way, Xuxa would continue conquering the children's public, but without leaving aside the public that consecrated it like Queen. The album features lyrics and more mature arrangements than previous releases. We have as an example the song "Hey DJ" in which the blonde bet on the funk from Rio that gained evidence in that period, already in 	"Dança Nas Estrelas" the romantic pop and "Happy-py" the bet on reggae sharing the vocals with Carlinhos Brown.

According to the controversial book Sonho de Paquitas (Dream of Paquitas), released in 1995, Popcorn was recorded for a play that Xuxa would do that year. The idea of recording the song came by chance. In an interview at the time, the blonde told that it was during a chat in her house with her businesswoman of the time, Marlene Mattos and composers Álvaro Socci and Cláudio Matta, until she commented on the desire that was to eat popcorn and soon then returned from the kitchen with several pots full of popcorn. Half-embarrassed, the composers said they had written a song that talked about candy. Xuxa was curious, they showed the song and she decided to record.

Sexto Sentido was the first record to win a title that was not the same as a Xuxa program and the first to be developed without the intention of using the tracks as a soundtrack on TV. The explanation of the title is due to a curious fact. When the hostess recorded the song "Sexto Sentido", a fan told that she had dreamed she'd put that title on the album and found it interesting. It is worth remembering that throughout the process of selection of repertoire, Xuxa and his team choose the songs through intuition, another reason that made this name for the album.

Sexto Sentido was produced by Michael Sullivan, had Artistic Direction by Aramis Barros and Artistic coordination by Marlene Mattos and Xuxa, recorded at the Som Livre studios.

Release and reception
Sexto Sentido was released on August 20, 1994 in CD, cassette and LP formats, The album was also re-released on CD in 1996, 2001 and 2006. Becoming a sales success, remaining 18 weeks among the TOP 10. In was awarded diamond certification by Associação Brasileira de Produtores de Discos (ABPD) for selling 1,000,000 units.

Promotion
The release of the Sexto Sentido began with the debut of the Xuxa Park program in June 1994. The re-recording of "É de Chocolate" began to serve as the opening theme of the attraction and performed in the last block and "Só Falta Você" was performed shortly after the messages of Good Morning. Cry of War that was specially composed for the program, was the unique song to be sung in all the seasons of the Xuxa Park. In addition to the performances, were music videos of the songs "Pipoca", "Hey DJ", "Sexto Sentido", "Dança da Bananeira", 	"Rir é o Melhor Remédio (Gargalhada)" and "Muito Prazer, Eu Existo". Initially, all tracks on the disc would win music videos.

The second stage of disclosure begins on August 21, 1994, when Xuxa presents the album in the program Domingão do Faustão. 2 days later a show was performed at the Imperator house in Rio de Janeiro to present the album.

In September, Xuxa gave interviews to the main Brazilian radio stations and shortly thereafter performed a mini-tour in nightclubs in São Paulo to promote the album. On October 7, 1994, the Sexto Sentido tour finally kicks off at the Olympia concert hall in São Paulo. The tour lasted until June 1996.

Track listing

Personnel
Produced by: Michael Sullivan
Art Direction: Aramis Barros
Artistic Coordination: Marlene Mattos and Xuxa Meneghel
Recording Technician: Jorge 'Gordo' Guimarães, Luiz G. D 'Orey, Edu Brito and Sergio Rocha
Production Assistant: Duda Nogueira
Recorded in the studios: Som Livre
Makeup Department: Promaster Digital
Mixing Technicians: Jorge 'Gordo' Guimarães
Studio Assistants and Mixing: Marcelo Seródio, Julio Carneiro, Mauro Moraes, Ivan Carvalho and Everaldo

Certifications

References

External links 
 Sexto Sentido at Discogs

1994 albums
Xuxa albums
Som Livre albums
Portuguese-language albums